Lebedyn Municipal Art Museum has a large collection of Old Masters and contemporary artworks. It is located in Lebedyn, Sumy Oblast, western Ukraine.

The museum's address is Lebedyn, Voli Sq. 1.

External links
http://prostir.museum/museums/en/show?c=92
http://www.wumag.kiev.ua/index2.php?param=pgs20064/120
http://en.tour-ua.com/regions/24/?PHPSESSID=21c3dc3a8f3f75b8e6211d385af7513f

Art museums and galleries in Ukraine
Museums in Sumy Oblast